Avinash Jadhav is a politician from the Maharashtra state of India. He belongs to the political party of Maharashtra Navnirman Sena (MNS). MNS Thane and Palghar district president.

Political career 
Avinash started his political journey with Maharashtra Navnirman Sena Thane district.

References

1989 births
Living people
Maharashtra Navnirman Sena politicians
People from Thane district
Politicians from Thane